Balfour House is an antebellum mansion located at the corner of Crawford Street and Cherry Street in Vicksburg, Mississippi. Built in 1835, it was the home of Emma Balfour, celebrated diarist of the Siege of Vicksburg. The red-brick, two-story structure features elements of Greek Revival and Federalist styles and is listed on the National Register of Historic Places.

1862 Christmas ball
In a scene reminiscent of the 1815 Duchess of Richmond's Ball prior to the Battle of Waterloo, Balfour House played host to a grand Christmas Ball on the night of December 24, 1862. The guests included many Confederate Army officers and their ladies. Among them was Brig. Gen. Martin Luther Smith, and Lt. Gen. Stephen D. Lee, who decades later published his own recollections of the fateful ball.

As the Christmas Eve revelry progressed, the telegraph office just across the Mississippi River in Louisiana received an urgent message from Major L.L. Daniel at Lake Providence, about 36 miles north.  Telegraph operator Colonel Philip H. Fall took the call.

The weather was cold and stormy, the river was dangerously turbulent and the only available transport across to Vicksburg was a small skiff.  It would mean risking his life, but Colonel Fall felt compelled to deliver the crucial information to General Smith, who he knew would be at the Balfours' Christmas Ball at that moment.

Shortly after midnight, Colonel Fall, exhausted and covered in mud, burst through the door of Balfour House and waded into the crowd of dancers, who gave him a wide berth.  When he saw General Smith he went directly to him and told him what he'd heard from Lake Providence.  Upon hearing the news, Smith announced loudly "This ball is at an end!  The enemy is coming down river.  All non-combatants must leave the city!" The men had only seconds to bid loved-ones good-bye as they rushed away and reported to station.  Later, on December 26, came the Battle of Chickasaw Bayou, the initial battle of the Vicksburg Campaign.

Siege of Vicksburg
During the Siege of Vicksburg, most houses were abandoned in favor of caves dug into hillsides for protection against mortar attacks, but Balfour House remained occupied. Emma Balfour famously refused to leave, and in fact used her home to shelter wounded Confederate soldiers.

With Union forces surrounding Vicksburg on all sides, and the Union Navy occupying the Mississippi River, the feeling of entrapment was palpable.  Emma wrote:  "What is to become of all the living things in this place when the boats commend shelling—God only knows—shut up as in a trap—no ingress or egress—and thousands of women and children...".

Union headquarters
After the Confederate surrender, Balfour House served as headquarters of Union Maj. Gen. James B. McPherson.

Notes

References

External links
 — includes images

Buildings and structures in Vicksburg, Mississippi
Houses on the National Register of Historic Places in Mississippi
Houses completed in 1835
Federal architecture in Mississippi
Colonial Revival architecture in Mississippi
Greek Revival houses in Mississippi
Houses in Warren County, Mississippi
National Register of Historic Places in Warren County, Mississippi